Shrek the Third (also known as Shrek 3) is a 2007 American computer-animated comedy film loosely based on the 1990 children's picture book Shrek! by William Steig. Directed by Chris Miller (in his feature directorial debut) and co-directed by Raman Hui from a screenplay by Jeffrey Price, Peter S. Seaman, Miller, and Aron Warner, the film is set after the events of Shrek 2 (2004) and is the third installment in the Shrek film series. The film features Mike Myers, Eddie Murphy, Cameron Diaz, Antonio Banderas, Rupert Everett, Julie Andrews, and John Cleese reprising their voice roles from the previous films, along with new additions Justin Timberlake as Arthur Pendragon and Eric Idle as Merlin. In the film, Prince Charming is plotting to overthrow Shrek and Fiona, who have inherited the throne following King Harold's death. Shrek has no interest in ruling the kingdom and attempts to convince Fiona's underachieving, 16-year-old cousin Artie to reign instead.

Shrek the Third premiered at the Mann Village Theatre, Westwood in Los Angeles on May 6, 2007, and was theatrically released in the United States by Paramount Pictures on May 18, 2007. Despite mixed-to-negative reviews, the film was a commercial success, grossing $813 million worldwide on a budget of $160 million, becoming the fourth-highest-grossing film of 2007. It was nominated for the Best Animated Film at the 61st British Academy Film Awards. Shrek the Third was the final film in the Shrek franchise to be co-produced by Pacific Data Images, which folded in 2015. The sequel, Shrek Forever After, was released in May 2010.

Plot
Three years after the events of the second film, Shrek and Princess Fiona are to succeed the dying King Harold, but Shrek's attempts to serve as the Regent during Harold's medical absence end in disaster. Shrek insists that an ogre as king is not ideal and that there must be someone else to rule Far Far Away. Before he dies, Harold tells Shrek of another heir: his nephew and Fiona's cousin, Arthur "Artie" Pendragon. Meanwhile, Prince Charming vows to become King of Far Far Away and avenge the death of his mother, the Fairy Godmother. Charming goes to the Poison Apple tavern and persuades fairy tale villains to fight for their "happily ever after".

Shrek, Donkey, and Puss in Boots set out to retrieve Artie. As they sail away, Fiona reveals to Shrek that she is pregnant, much to Shrek's horror, as he believes that he is incapable of raising children. The trio journey to Worcestershire Academy, an elite magical boarding school, where they discover Artie is a scrawny, 16-year-old underachiever. At the school pep rally, Shrek tells Artie he has been chosen to be king of Far Far Away. Artie is excited until Donkey and Puss inadvertently frighten him by discussing the king's responsibilities. Losing confidence, Artie tries to take control of the ship and steer it back to Worcestershire; following a scuffle with Shrek, the ship crashes on a remote island where they encounter Artie's retired wizard teacher, Merlin.

Fiona and Queen Lillian host Snow White, Cinderella, Sleeping Beauty, Rapunzel, and Doris the Ugly Stepsister for a baby shower when Charming and other villains attack Far Far Away along with the castle. Gingy, Pinocchio, the Big Bad Wolf, and the Three Little Pigs stall Charming's group long enough for the ladies to escape. When one of the pigs accidentally reveals that Shrek has gone to retrieve Artie, Charming sends Captain Hook and his pirates to track them down. The ladies are locked in a tower after Rapunzel betrays them, having fallen in love with Charming.

Hook and his pirates catch up to Shrek on Merlin's island. Shrek avoids capture, and Hook reveals Charming's takeover of Far Far Away. Shrek urges Artie to return to Worcestershire. Instead, Artie cons Merlin into using his magic to send them to Far Far Away. The spell causes Puss and Donkey to accidentally switch bodies. They find Pinocchio and learn that Charming plans to kill Shrek as part of a play. After breaking into the castle, they are caught and taken captive.

Charming prepares to kill Artie to retain the crown. To save Artie's life, Shrek lies, claiming that he was just using Artie to replace him as the next king. Charming believes Shrek and allows a disheartened Artie to leave. Donkey and Puss are imprisoned with Fiona and the ladies, where Fiona grows frustrated with their lack of initiative. Lillian smashes an opening in the stone wall of the prison with a headbutt. While the princesses launch a rescue mission for Shrek, Donkey and Puss free Gingy, Pinocchio, and the others along with Dragon and Donkey's children. Puss and Donkey mollify Artie by explaining that Shrek lied to save Artie's life.

Charming stages a showdown in a musical theater in front of the kingdom. Just as Charming is about to kill Shrek, Fiona, Puss, and Donkey, the princesses and other fairy tale characters confront the villains, but are quickly subdued. Artie shows up and gives a speech to the villains, convincing them that they can be accepted into society instead of being outcasts. The villains agree to give up their evil ways, while Charming refuses to listen and lunges at Artie with his sword. Shrek blocks the blow and it appears that he has been stabbed. Charming decrees himself the new king, but Shrek reveals that the sword missed and pushes Charming aside, while Dragon knocks the tower down onto Charming.

Artie is crowned the new king. While the kingdom celebrates, Merlin reverts Puss and Donkey's body swap. Meanwhile, back at the swamp, Shrek and Fiona begin raising their new triplets, coping with parenthood with help from Donkey, Puss, Lillian, and Dragon.

Voice cast

Production 
Following the success of Shrek 2, the third and fourth Shrek films, along with plans for a final, fifth film, were announced in May 2004 by Jeffrey Katzenberg: "Shrek 3 and 4 are going to reveal other unanswered questions and, finally, in the last chapter, we will understand how Shrek came to be in that swamp, when we meet him in the first movie."

DreamWorks hired screenwriters Jeffrey Price and Peter S. Seaman (of both Who Framed Roger Rabbit, Doc Hollywood and How the Grinch Stole Christmas fame) to write the script of the film and Jon Zack, who wrote The Perfect Score, came on board as a consultant. Unlike the first two films, the film was not directed by Andrew Adamson due to his occupation with The Chronicles of Narnia: The Lion, the Witch and the Wardrobe. Adamson was still involved as an executive producer, and was giving advice approximately every four months on the state of the film. Shrek the Third was instead directed by Chris Miller, a story artist on the first film and a head of story on the second, and co-directed by Raman Hui, a supervising animator on the first two films.

The film was developed under the working title of Shrek 3. By March 2006, the title of the film was changed to Shrek the Third. According to Miller, the reason behind the title change was because they "didn't want to just sort of title it like it was just a sequel," instead they wanted "something to make it stand on its own, give it its own personality and really try to treat it as a chapter in Shrek's life." Hui also remarked: "It's about Shrek becoming the new king of Far Far Away; the title sounds kind of royal as well."

The film was originally going to be released in November 2006; however, in December 2004, the date was changed to May 2007; "The sheer magnitude of the Shrek franchise has led us to conclude that a May release date, with a DVD release around the holiday season, will enable us to best maximize performance and increase profitability, thereby generating enhanced asset value and better returns for our shareholders." Katzenberg explained. Flushed Away, another film from DreamWorks Animation, was instead given the slot of November 2006. The release date change was also the day after Disney/Pixar changed the release date of Cars, from November 2005 to June 2006.

Reception

Box office 
Shrek the Third opened in 4,122 North American cinemas on May 18, 2007, grossing $38 million on its first day, which was the biggest opening day for an animated film at the time. It grossed a total of $121.6 million in its first weekend, the best opening weekend ever for an animated film, and the second-highest opening for a film in the United States in 2007, behind Spider-Man 3. It held the animated opening weekend record for nine years until it was surpassed by Finding Dorys $135.1 million debut. At the time, its opening weekend was the third-highest of all time in these regions.

Shrek the Third grossed $322.7 million in the United States, and $490.7 million overseas, bringing its cumulative total to $813.4 million. The film was the fourth-highest-grossing film worldwide of 2007, and the second-highest-grossing film in the United States that year. In addition, it was the highest-grossing animated film of 2007, and the third-highest-grossing animated film ever, trailing only behind Finding Nemo and Shrek 2. The film sold an estimated 46,907,000 tickets in North America.

The film was released in the United Kingdom on June 29, 2007, and topped the country's box office for the next two weekends, before being dethroned by Harry Potter and the Order of the Phoenix.

Critical reception 
The site's critical consensus reads, "Shrek the Third has pop culture potshots galore, but at the expense of the heart, charm, and wit that made the first two Shreks classics." On Metacritic, the film has a weighted average score of 58 out of 100, based on 35 critics, indicating "mixed or average reviews". Audiences polled by CinemaScore gave the film an average grade of "B+" on an A+ to F scale, a step down from the first two films' "A".

Some critics were confused as to the film's target demographic. Carina Chocano of the Los Angeles Times felt themes about career and parenting anxieties, the lifestyle of celebrities, as well as its humor, would be above children: "Does a kids' movie really need, among other similar touches, a Hooters joke? I, for one, wouldn't want to have to explain it." Nonetheless, she also found certain moments to be funny: "Shrek's anxiety dream about procreating is fabulously surreal, and King Harold's deathbed scene, with its grimaces and false alarms, is pure kiddie comedy at its best." David Ansen of Newsweek wrote that the film's "slightly snarky wit is aimed almost entirely at parents... this one never touched my heart or got under my skin. It's a movie at war with itself: a kiddie movie that doesn't really want to be one."

Peter Bradshaw of The Guardian gave the film 2 out of 5 stars, saying the film "wasn't awful, but it's bland, with a barrel-scraping averageness. There are no new ideas, no very funny new characters..." He called the character Merlin a "frankly unfunny new character" and considered the character to be a "rip-off of Albus Dumbledore from the Harry Potter franchise". He stated that the film contained "no decent musical numbers, incidentally, and the one cover version is bizarrely chosen. For Harold's funeral, we get a rendering of ... Paul McCartney's "Live and Let Die". Er ... huh? Because it's kind of sad and it has "die" in the title?"

The Times of London rated it 2 out of 5.

A. O. Scott from The New York Times described the film as "at once more energetic and more relaxed [than its predecessors], less desperate to prove its cleverness and therefore to some extent, smarter."

Awards and nominations

Soundtrack

Home media
The film was released on both DVD and HD DVD on November 13, 2007. The DVD was released in separate pan and scan and widescreen formats. The film and special features on the HD DVD version were presented in 1.78:1 widescreen high-definition 1080p and feature a Dolby Digital Plus 5.1 audio soundtrack, and special features for both formats include several deleted scenes, features, trailers, commentary, music videos, and exclusively on the HD DVD version, some web-enabled and HDi Interactive Format features such as a special trivia track, a film guide, and an interactive coloring book which can be downloaded as of street date.

Following Paramount's decision to discontinue HD DVD production (making Shrek the Third the only DreamWorks Animation film to be released on that format), the film was subsequently released on Blu-ray Disc on September 16, 2008. It was re-released on Blu-ray as part of the Shrek: The Whole Story boxset on December 7, 2010 before receiving another separate release on August 30, 2011, and on Blu-ray 3D on November 1, 2011 as a Best Buy exclusive.

DVD and Blu-Ray sales gathered revenue of $179.1 million.

Marketing

Shrek The Third was widely anticipated and DreamWorks backed the film with a large marketing campaign, with toys, books, games, clothes, and many other items becoming available throughout 2007. A video game based on the film has been released for the Wii, PlayStation 2, Xbox 360, Game Boy Advance, PlayStation Portable, PC, and Nintendo DS.

In May 2007, Shrek The Third was made into a mobile video game, developed by Gameloft. Shrek n' Roll, an action puzzle game based on the film, was released for the Xbox 360 via Xbox Live Arcade on November 14, 2007.
A pinball machine based on the film has also been produced by Stern Pinball.

Satirical marketing effort
Adult Swim comedy team Tim and Eric, annoyed by the amount of advertisement they had witnessed in the months approaching the release of the film, decided to independently "promote" Shrek the Third in a series of internet videos
as well as appearances on television and radio to encourage people to see the film.

Controversy
In the beginning of the film, in Prince Charming's dinner theater, coconuts are revealed to be the source of the sound effect for horses' hoof beats. This same joke was used in Monty Python and the Holy Grail, which also starred John Cleese and Eric Idle. Idle walked out of the premiere (though later reentered after calming himself down) and claimed to be considering suing the producers of Shrek for the unauthorized use of this gag, while the producers claim they were honouring Idle and Cleese by putting the part in.

Sequel

The film was followed by the sequel, Shrek Forever After, which was released in theatres on May 21, 2010.

Notes

  In July 2014, the film's distribution rights were purchased by DreamWorks Animation from Paramount Pictures and transferred to 20th Century Fox before reverting to Universal Studios in 2018.

References

External links
 
 
 
 

2007 films
2007 computer-animated films
2000s adventure comedy films
2000s American animated films
2000s buddy comedy films
2000s fantasy adventure films
2000s pregnancy films
American adventure comedy films
American buddy comedy films
Animated films about animals
American children's animated adventure films
American children's animated comedy films
American children's animated fantasy films
American computer-animated films
American fantasy comedy films
American pregnancy films
American sequel films
Animated buddy films
Animated films about dragons
Animated films about revenge
Arthurian animated films
Body swapping in films
DreamWorks Animation animated films
Fairy tale parody films
Films with screenplays by Andrew Adamson
Films with screenplays by Jeffrey Price and Peter S. Seaman
Films scored by Harry Gregson-Williams
Films about royalty
Films produced by Aron Warner
Films set in the Middle Ages
Paramount Pictures animated films
Paramount Pictures films
Shrek 3
Films about witchcraft
Films about wizards
2007 directorial debut films
2007 comedy films
2000s English-language films